Partecosta albofuscata is a species of sea snail, a marine gastropod mollusc in the family Terebridae, the auger snails.

Description

Distribution

References

 Bozzetti L. (2008). Six new Terebridae (Gastropoda: Neogastropoda: Terebridae) from southern Madagascar. Malacologia Mostra Mondiale, 60: 9–14

External links
 Fedosov, A. E.; Malcolm, G.; Terryn, Y.; Gorson, J.; Modica, M. V.; Holford, M.; Puillandre, N. (2020). Phylogenetic classification of the family Terebridae (Neogastropoda: Conoidea). Journal of Molluscan Studies

Terebridae
Gastropods described in 2008